Alain Madeleine-Perdrillat (7 September 1949, Paris) is a French art historian.

Biography 
Alain Madeleine-Perdrillat led the Communications Department of the Réunion des Musées Nationaux for several years then the communication service of the institut national d'histoire de l'art.

He is the author of a monograph on Seurat (Skira, 1990), a study of the correspondence of Nicolas de Staël (Hazan, 2003) as well as popular books on painting.

A poetry lover, he wrote in journals about Yves Bonnefoy and Philippe Jaccottet. He also translated Masolino et Masaccio by Roberto Longhi (1981).

Publications 
1990: Seurat, Skira
1994: Un dimanche avec Vermeer, Skira.
1994: Un dimanche au Louvre, Skira.
1994: Un dimanche avec Cézanne, Skira.
2003: Nicolas de Staël, Hazan.
2004: De longues absences suivi de Treize poèmes d'hiver en Corrèze, La Dogana.
2010: Laurent de La Hyre, La Mort des enfants de Béthel, éditions Invenit.
2011: La vie d'un peintre par Gino Sévérini, Hazan.
2013: Alexandre Hollan : L'expérience de voir (sous la direction), Somogy Éditions d'Art.
2015: Damiers, avec des Textes d'Yves Bonnefoy et Alain Madeleine-Perdrillat, Cendres.

References

External links 
 Chroniques et livres d'Alain Madeleine-Perdrillat
 Notice
 Alain Madeleine-Perdrillat on France Culture
 Rencontre entre Claude Garache et Alain Madeleine-Perdrillat on Daily Motion 
 De Staël by Alain-Madeleine Perdrillat
 Jules Bourgoin (1838-1908). L'obsession du trait preface by Alain Madeleine-Perdrillat

Writers from Paris
1949 births
Living people
French art historians